Bors (also referred to as Bors-de-Baignes, to distinguish it from Bors near Montmoreau-Saint-Cybard) is a commune in the Charente department in southwestern France.

Population

See also
Communes of the Charente department

References

Communes of Charente